Temptation of Wife, also called Lure of Wife, is South Korean television series starring Jang Seo-hee, Byun Woo-min, Kim Seo-hyung and Lee Jae-hwang. It aired on SBS every Mondays to Fridays at 19:20 from November 3, 2008, to May 1, 2009, for 129 episodes. Temptation of Wife was a highly watched drama in South Korea. Despite many controversies concerning the questionable content of the drama, it remains one of the most viewed dramas with a daily average viewership of around 30%, and netted the cast several awards including the Daesang (Grand Prize) for lead actress Jang Seo Hee at the SBS Drama Awards.

Temptation of Wife was part of the "Wife Trilogy", which includes Two Wives and Wife Returns. The series has two localised adaptations from China and the Philippines, as well as a 2009 male version of the series titled Temptation of an Angel.

Plot summary
Goo Eun-jae (Jang Seo-hee) graduated as a make-up artist major at a university and began preparations to study in France. Her dreams to study abroad are halted by pregnancy after Jung Gyo-bin (Byun Woo-min) takes advantage of her when she is drunk. She decides to marry him and give up on her dreams in order to be a responsible mother to her unborn child. Eun-jae's pregnancy ends in a tragic miscarriage when she tries to protect her mother in law, Baek Mi-in (Geum Bo-ra), from being pushed down the steps by a creditor. Eun-jae falls and loses her baby. It takes a long time until Eun-jae becomes pregnant again. Around this time, Shin Ae-ri (Kim Seo-hyung) returns from her five-year-long studies from France where she studied make-up.

Ae-ri grew up in the same household as Eun-jae since she became an orphan at age ten. Her family was on the way to the Goo's household in order to have dinner with them when Ae-ri threw her clothes and doll at her father who was driving. As they were travelling in a storm, her father crashed the car. Both Ae-ri's parents and her younger sister inside her mother died and the Goo Family took in Ae-ri and raised her for 20 years along with Eun-jae, treating her as if she was their own daughter. Later on, Ae-ri became the girlfriend of Eun-jae's brother, Kang-jae (Choi Joon-yong). Then, she left for France, revealing that someone was taking care of her tuitions for her.

After 7 years of living with the Jung family as Gyo-bin's housewife (and also as the housekeeper to the Jung family's mansion), Eun-jae soon discovers that her husband has been cheating on her with Ae-ri. It turns out that it was he who funded Ae-ri's travel to France. To add to this insult, Ae-ri reveals that she bore Gyo-bin's child five years prior named Jung Ni-no (Jung Yun-seok). Eun-jae's brother, Kang-jae, learns about the situation, upon which he sets out in anger to assault Gyo-bin. This event leads to Kang Jae and his mother in forcing Eun-jae to sign consent for a divorce. After the divorce, Gyo-bin and Ae-ri marry while Eun-jae moves back to her own family's house. Ae-ri goes to pay a visit to Eun-jae, demanding her to get an abortion. Eun-jae refuses to do so because of which Gyo-bin drags her to a gynecologist in Sokcho, forcing her into aborting their baby. Eun-jae again refuses. Gyo-bin then drives her to Sokcho Beach, throwing her necklace, given by her father-in-law as a promise not to give up on Gyo-bin, into the sea. Eun-jae tries to save the necklace, but not knowing how to swim, she soon finds herself being dragged away by the waves. Eun-jae begs Gyo-bin to save their baby but Gyo-bin ignores Eun-jae and abandons her at sea to drown and die. Ae-ri and Gyo-bin decide to keep this all a secret, lying that Eun-jae had committed suicide. Ae-ri fakes Eun-jae's suicide note which she gives to the police and Gyo-bin thereafter tells everybody that he had not seen Eun-jae the whole day.

In the midst of all this, Min Gun-woo (Lee Jae-hwang), the adoptive son of Lady Min (Jung Ae-ri) was near Sokcho in a search for his missing younger stepsister, Min So-hee (Chae Young-in). So-hee loved Gun-woo and wanted to marry him. When her mother, Lady Min refused, So-hee told Gun-woo to marry her secretly anyway. Gun-woo had decided not to tell his mother what was happening, as So-hee had run away from home. Lady Min arranged for another girl to marry Gun-woo, hoping that So-hee will give up and come back. So-hee arranges a marriage to Gun-woo on the same day as Lady Min arranges marriage. Gun-wo decides to follow his mother's wishes and marries the other girl. So-hee devastated that he did not come, then walks into the sea to drown herself. Gun-woo, searching for So-hee, finds Eun-jae's unconscious body instead. He then takes her to a physician doctor who reveals that she must lose the baby in order for her to be saved. Through the help of Gun-woo and the doctor, Eun-jae is allowed to live in the hospital for free where she worked at the same time to show her gratitude.

Lady Min, thinking Eun-jae's experience was similar to hers, introduces Eun-jae to her home. Thereafter, Eun-jae takes on the identity of So-hee, in order to seek revenge against Gyo-bin and Ae-ri who had destroyed her life and tried to kill her. Gun-woo falls in love with Eun-jae in the process and Eun-jae with Gun-woo, but Eun-jae decides to hold her feelings back for him in order to fulfill her revenge. Ae-ri gets suspicious of the woman claiming to be So-hee. One day, the two women meet and Ae-ri is positive that So-hee is Eun-jae. Eun-jae acted well and said that Ae-ri was crazy. Gyo-bin divorces Ae-ri and marries So-hee (Eun-jae). Gyo-bin kicks Ae-ri out of her house but keeps Ni-no, his son with Eun-jae.

Ae-ri gets even more suspicious and calls Gyo-bin when she sees So-hee (Eun-jae) and Gun-woo embrace each other. So-hee (Eun-jae) reassures that she loves Gyo-bin and that's why she has married him, ensuring him that Gun-woo and she are just close siblings. Gyo-bin wants to sleep with So-hee (Eun-jae), but she brings twin beds instead of one big bed and refuses his advances. Ae-ri begs for Gyo-bin and his family to give her son to her. Ae-ri gets Ni-no, but Ni-no gets injured and Ae-ri pities her son as she is now poor and would not be able to provide him a comfortable life. She returns Ni-no to Gyo-bin's family.

So-hee (Eun-jae) soon becomes worried about her true identity to be revealed by Ae-ri. So, with the help of Lady Min, they go to her parents and tells them the truth who helps her to have her true identity still covered. In order to complete her revenge, she tricks Gyo-bin to give all his family assets to her and her "mother" Lady Min, his father's company, their house, his mother's house and land and causes their family to go bankrupt. Lady Min had a history with Gyo Bin's father. They had a child together (they were not married) named Star. To Lady Min, Gyo Bin's father supposedly killed Star due to a sickness that was never treated and killed Lady Min's father by stealing their land. Lady Min gets revenge by telling him to give all his assets (including Cheonji Constructions) and selling his house because of items on properties that were created by Gyo-bin to Lady Min. Because of this, he complied and gave them up. To humiliate his family further, Lady Min gets his family to switch houses with Eun-jae's family, or his large house will be auctioned and sold away. Gyo-bin's family is now poor while Eun-jae's family is now living more comfortably. Gyo-bin says that he now loves Eun-jae and tries to force her to stay with him since they are still lawfully wedded but the disgusted Eun-jae hates him.

The real So-hee appears, having suffered from serious depression. She gets mad at Eun-jae because Gun-woo has fallen in love with her and they had planned a wedding where So-hee later crashes. One day, when Eun-jae goes to work and everyone praises her for her make-up artist skills, So-hee tells all the workers that she was the real daughter of Lady Min and she proclaims herself the owner of Min Beauty Shop. Ae-ri sees this and asks So-hee to cooperate with her to ruin Eun-jae's life. At first, this works out. Later, when Ae-ri becomes the reason for Gun-woo to divorce So-hee, their collaboration ends. Lady Min persuades Gun-woo to marry So-hee because he thinks her depression would get better and Soo Hee won't ruin Eun-jae's life. So-hee does the complete opposite.

Eun-jae continues to become the best makeup artist and lives now with her family. One day, Gun-woo goes to work to sign a contract with Harrison. Ae-ri wants to be back with Gyo-bin and bring back the position he had before and also the construction company, so Ha-jo (Kim Dong-hyun) tells Gyo-bin to sign the contract. Meanwhile, So-hee ruins Eun-jae's artwork and rips a page out. While they fight, Ae-ri calls Gyo-bin about how Eun-jae was being attacked by So-hee. Gun-woo turns the car and drives to the Beauty Shop. He sees So-hee ripping the page and tells her to divorce him. Gun-woo is now late for his meeting, so Ha-jo tells Gyo-bin to sign the contract instead. Gun-woo decides to divorce So-hee no matter what. Ae-ri comes back to the family. She makes Gyo-bin sleep with her, making her pregnant. While she is pregnant, doctors discover that she has a tumor in her stomach. Doctors reluctantly tell her to get an abortion so she could receive the cancer treatment, but she adamantly refuses. She felt that the baby was the only way to keep her and Gyo-bin together.

Ae-rii and Eun-jae participate in a makeup competition that has three stages. After the first stage, Top 3 included Eun-jae, another lady and Ae-ri. They would be competing against one another. Ae-ri and Eun-jae win advances to the next round and would be competing against each other. In the third stage, Ae-ri gets desperate so she secretly bribes the judges. The judges are just about to proclaim Ae-ri as the grand prize winner, but find out just in time about the bribes, so they disqualify Ae-ri and awards Eun-jae as the winner. Ae-ri has a miscarriage, but this time after realizing her mistakes, Eun-jae find the heart to forgive her childhood best friend and both of them become true friends again. Eun-jae insists that Ae-ri get the cancer treatment, but Ae-ri is scared that the chemotherapy will make her not be as beautiful as she once was and also overwhelmed by the guilt of her past actions, and decides to let cancer kill her.

In the last episode, Ha-neul / Star (Oh Young-sil) marries and becomes pregnant with her husband Kang-jae. Ae-ri and Gyo-bin go on vacation during which Ae-ri makes a seashell necklace for Ni-no. Ae Ri begins to make two letters, one for Gyo-bin and the other for Eun-jae. Overwhelmed by her guilt and knowing that she will die someday, Ae-ri goes to the ocean to commit suicide but Gyo-bin attempts to save her. Ae-ri screams at him to let her go and tells him that he needs to take care of Ni-no and that she was going to die anyway. He tries to save her, but the ocean current is too strong. Both of them drown and dies. All the families attend their funeral. Eun-jae gives Ni-no the seashell necklace saying that it was the last present from his mother. Ni-no goes onto the street and a car nearly crashes into him. He states his mother and father were on the other side of the street. Everybody assumes that they were protecting their son from danger. Ae-ri's letter to Eun-jae says to bury her ashes on the beach where Eun-jae had almost died.

So-hee and Lady Min decide to go to the United States together. Lady Min gives Ha-jo the papers to own Cheonji Constructions once more. Gun-woo meets Eun-jae while she is spreading the ashes. He apologizes for hurting her feelings and says that he won't do it again. He feels that Eun-jae should be his wife. So-hee gives Eun-jae two rings and a letter entrusting Gun Woo to Eun-jae. Gun-woo puts his arm around Eun-jae and looks at the sky with her. They are sure that they see Ae-ri and Gyo-bin together. The whole drama ends by having the two couples smiling at each other.

Cast

Main
 Jang Seo-hee as Goo Eun-jae / Min So-hee
 Byun Woo-min as Jung Gyo-bin
 Kim Seo-hyung as Shin Ae-ri / MiChell Shin
 Lee Jae-hwang as Min Gun-woo

Supporting
Eun-jae's family
 Kim Yong-gun as Goo Young-soo
Eun-jae's father
 Yoon Mi-ra as Yoon Mi-ja
Eun-jae's mother
 Choi Joon-yong as Goo Kang-jae
Eun-jae's big brother

Gyo-bin's family
 Kim Dong-hyun as Jung Ha-jo
 Gyo-bin's father
 Geum Bo-ra as Baek Mi-in 
 Gyo-bin's mother
 Oh Young-sil as Jung Ha-neul / Star
 Gyo-bin's half sister, Lady Min and Ha-jo's love child
 Song Hee-ah as Jung Soo-bin
 Gyo-bin's little sister
 Jung Yoon-seok as Jung Ni-no
 Gyo-bin & Ae-ri's son

Gun-woo's family
 Jung Ae-ri as Min Hyun-joo / Lady Min
 Gun-woo's adoptive mother
 Chae Young-in as Min So-hee
 Gun-woo's adopt little sister

Controversy
Temptation of Wife has been widely criticized for its content and production. It gained criticism from the audiences when Eun Jae comes back as So Hee by drawing a mole on her left cheek and everyone fails to recognize her as Eun Jae. Other characters also believe that So Hee is not Eun Jae because of the different personalities. Eun Jae was sweet and friendly, while So Hee is mean and ruthless. Other controversies were related to the speediness of the drama and overly set up plot. Furthermore, there was a lawsuit involving author Jung Hye Kyung, who claimed that Temptation of a Wife plagiarized her book Janus' City.

Ratings

Adaptations

Temptation of an Angel

A male version of Temptation of Wife, starring Bae Soo-bin and Lee So-yeon, was broadcast on SBS in late 2009.

Temptation of Wife (Philippine adaptation)

In the Philippines, GMA Network produced a Filipino remake of Temptation of Wife. It was broadcast on GMA from October 29, 2012, to April 5, 2013.

Dendam Seorang Isteri (Malaysian adaptation)
Radius One Sdn. Bhd. has picked up to produce a Malaysian version of Temptation of Wife, known as Dendam Seorang Isteri [MS], which will broadcast on Astro Prima beginning March 21, 2022.

References

External links
  
 

Seoul Broadcasting System television dramas
South Korean melodrama television series
South Korean television series remade in other languages
2008 South Korean television series debuts
2009 South Korean television series endings
Korean-language television shows
Television series about revenge
Television shows written by Kim Soon-ok